Salimabad (also Romanized as Salīmābād) is a village in Masal Rural District, in the Central District of Masal County, Gilan Province, Iran. At the 2006 census, its population was 122, in 29 families.

References 

Populated places in Masal County